Lange Nelle Lighthouse is a lighthouse in Ostend, Flanders, Belgium. It is located at the Belgian coastline of the North Sea.

While the station was established in 1771, the present lighthouse tower was opened in 1949. The lighthouse tower was painted white and blue waves in 1994.

References

External links

 Shipping Assistance Division

Lighthouses completed in 1948
Ostend
Lighthouses in Belgium